Hans Oeschger (2 April 1927, Ottenbach – 25 December 1998, Bern) was a Swiss climatologist. He founded the Division of Climate and Environmental Physics at the Physics Institute of the University of Bern in 1963 and was the director until his retirement in 1992.

Oeschger was the first to date the "age" of Pacific deep water. The Oeschger counter was the leading instrument for many years which enabled the Oeschger's team to measure the activity of naturally occurring radioisotopes.

Oeschger was a pioneer and leader in ice core research. In collaboration with his colleagues he was the first to measure the glacial-interglacial change of atmospheric . They showed in 1979 that the atmospheric concentration of  during the glacial was almost 50% lower than today.

Together with his colleagues Chester C. Langway and Willi Dansgaard, he documented a series of abrupt climate changes in the Greenland ice cores now known as Dansgaard-Oeschger events.

Hans Oeschger was deeply troubled by the potential of an increased greenhouse effect caused by the steady increase of atmospheric . He said: “The worst for me would be, if there were serious changes in the next 5 to 10 years and we scientists are helpless and did not have the courage to point at these dangerous developments early.”

He was a lead author of the First Assessment Report of the Intergovernmental Panel on Climate Change.

The European Geophysical Society established the Hans Oeschger Medal in his honour in 2001.

The centre of excellence for climate research at the University of Bern (Oeschger Centre for Climate Change Research), which was founded in 2007, is named after Hans Oeschger.

Awards
Urey Medal, 1987
Seligman Crystal, 1991
Marcel Benoist Prize, 1990
Tyler Prize for Environmental Achievement, 1996
Roger Revelle Medal of the American Geophysical Union, 1997

References

External links 
 Obituary
 Official website of the Oeschger Centre for Climate Change Research

1927 births
1998 deaths
Swiss climatologists
Foreign associates of the National Academy of Sciences